A trunnion (from Old French "trognon", trunk) is a cylindrical protrusion used as a mounting or pivoting point. First associated with cannons, they are an important military development.

Alternatively, a trunnion is a shaft that positions and supports a tilting plate. This is a misnomer, as in reality it is a cradle for the true trunnion. 

In mechanical engineering (see the trunnion bearing section below), it is one part of a rotating joint where a shaft (the trunnion) is inserted into (and turns inside) a full or partial cylinder.

Medieval history

In a cannon, the trunnions are two projections cast just forward of the center of mass of the cannon and fixed to a two-wheeled movable gun carriage.  As they allowed the muzzle to be raised and lowered easily, the integral casting of trunnions is seen by military historians as one of the most important advances in early field artillery.

With the creation of larger and more powerful siege guns in the early 15th century, a new way of mounting them became necessary. Stouter gun carriages were created with reinforced wheels, axles, and “trails” which extended behind the gun. Guns were now as long as eight feet in length and they were capable of shooting iron projectiles weighing from twenty-five to fifty pounds. When discharged, these wrought iron balls were comparable in range and accuracy with stone-firing bombards.

Trunnions were mounted near the center of mass to allow the barrel to be elevated to any desired angle, without having to dismount it from the carriage upon which it rested. Some guns had a second set of trunnions placed several feet back from the first pair, which could be used to allow for easier transportation. The gun would recoil causing the carriage to move backwards several feet but men or a team of horses could put it back into firing position. It became easier to rapidly transport these large siege guns, maneuver them from transportation mode to firing position, and they could go wherever a team of men or horses could pull them.

Initial significance
Due to its capabilities, the French- and Burgundy-designed siege gun, equipped with its trunnions, required little significant modification from around 1465 to the 1840s.

King Charles VIII and the French army used this new gun in the 1494 invasion of Italy.  Although deemed masters of war and artillery at that time, Italians had not anticipated the innovations in French siege weaponry. Prior to this, field artillery guns were huge, large-caliber bombards: superguns that, along with enormous stones or other projectiles, were dragged from destination to destination. These behemoths could only be used effectively in sieges, and more often than not provided just a psychological effect on the battlefield; owning these giant mortars did not guarantee any army a victory. The French saw the limitations of these massive weapons and focused their efforts on improving their smaller and lighter guns, which used smaller, more manageable projectiles combined with larger amounts of gunpowder. Equipping them with trunnions was key for two reasons. First, teams of horses could now move these cannons fast enough to keep up with their armies and no longer had to stop and dismount them from their carriages to achieve the proper range before firing; second, the capability to adjust firing angle without having to lift the entire weight of the gun allowed tactical selection and reselection of targets rather than being deployed solely on the first target chosen. Francesco Guicciardini, an Italian historian and statesman, wrote that the cannons were placed against town walls so quickly, spaced together so closely and shot so rapidly and with such force that the time for a significant amount of damage to be inflicted went from a matter of days (as with bombards) to a matter of hours. For the first time in history, as seen in the 1512 battle of Ravenna and the 1515 Battle of Marignano, artillery weaponry played a very decisive part in the victory of the invading army over the city under siege. Cities that had proudly withstood sieges for up to seven years fell swiftly with the advent of these new weapons.

Defensive tactics and fortifications had to be altered since these new weapons could be transported so speedily and aimed with much more accuracy at strategic locations. Two significant changes were the additions of a ditch and low, sloping ramparts of packed earth (glacis) that would surround the city and absorb the impact of the cannonballs, and the replacement of round watchtowers with angular bastions. These towers would be deemed trace Italienne.
	
Whoever could afford these new weapons had the tactical advantage over their neighbors and smaller sovereignties, which could not incorporate them into their army. Smaller states, such as the principalities of Italy, began to conglomerate. Preexisting stronger entities, such as France or the Habsburg emperors, were able to expand their territories and maintain a tighter control over the land they already occupied. With the potential threat of their land and castles being seized, the nobility began to pay their taxes and more closely follow their ruler’s mandates. With siege guns mounted on trunnions, stronger and larger states were formed, but because of this, struggles between neighboring governments with consolidated power began to ensue and would continue to plague Europe for the next few centuries.

Usages

In dams
A common floodgate used in dams and canal locks is the Tainter gate. This gate opens and closes by pivoting on a trunnion which extends into the mass of the dam or lock. The Tainter gate is used in water control dams and locks worldwide.  The Upper Mississippi River basin alone has 321 Tainter gates, and the Columbia River basin has 195.

In vehicles
In older cars, the trunnion is part of the suspension and either allows free movement of the rear wheel hub in relation to the chassis or allows the front wheel hub to rotate with the steering. On many cars (such as those made by the Triumph) the trunnion is machined from a brass or bronze casting and is prone to failure if not greased properly. American Motors recommended lubrication of its pre-packed front suspension trunnions using a sodium base grease every  or three years. It later incorporated molded rubber "Clevebloc" bushings on the upper trunnion to seal out dirt and retain silicone lubricant for the life of the car.
In aviation, the term refers to the structural component that attaches the undercarriage or landing gear to the airframe. For aircraft equipped with retractable landing gear, the trunnion is pivoted to permit rotation of the entire gear assembly.
In heavy equipment, such as a bulldozer, the term refers to the protrusions on the vehicle frame on which the blade frame attaches and hinges allowing vertical movement.
In Chevrolet GMC C/K pickup trucks, the term refers to the tailgate attachment points.  Rather than using conventional tailgate hinges, trunnions are used to permit quick toolless removal and installation of the pickup tailgate.
In axles, the term refers to the type of suspension used on a multi-axle configurations. It is a "short axle pivoted at or near its mid-point about a horizontal axis transverse to its own centerline, normally used in pairs in conjunction with a walking beam in order to achieve two axis of oscillation."  This type of suspension allows  to be loaded on an axle group.
In trailers, leveling jacks may have trunnion mounts. 
In the valve train of a pushrod engine, the term refers to the fixed axle that acts as a pivot point for the valve rocker.

In other technology
In steam engines, they are supporting gudgeon pins on either side of an oscillating steam cylinder. They are usually tubular and convey steam. 
On communication satellites, the antennas are usually mounted on a pair of trunnions to allow the beam pattern to be correctly pointed on the Earth from the geostationary orbit.
On stage lighting instruments, a trunnion is a bracket attached to both ends of a striplight that allows the striplight to be mounted on the floor. Sometimes trunnions are also equipped with casters to allow the striplight to be moved easily.
In woodworking, they are the assembly that holds a saw's arbor to the underside of the saw table.
In waste collection, the trunnion is the bar on the front of a Dumpster that connects to the back of a garbage truck.
On the Space Shuttle, trunnion pins are affixed to the sides of payload items allowing them to be secured to receivers mounted on the sills of the payload bay. These receivers can be remotely commanded to secure and release selected items. Similar keel pins protrude from the nadir side of payload items, into matching holes in the bottom of the payload bay.
On hydraulic cylinders, a trunnion (either featuring external pins or internal pockets) can be an alternative body mounting type, as opposed to a flange or pin eye.
In steelmaking, on the Bessemer converter. There are trunnions on either side to be able to pour out the molten steel.
 In surveying total stations and theodolites, the trunnion axis is the axis about which the telescope transits. It is parallel to the horizontal axis defined by the tubular spirit bubble.
 In Dobsonian telescope designs, commonly known as altitude bearings.
 In structural engineering, a type of bascule bridge, with the road deck on one side of the trunnion, and the counterweight on the other.
 In laboratory centrifuges, trunnions are used to pivot sample buckets in swinging-bucket rotors.
 In nuclear power plants, when the steam generators are replaced, trunnions are used to upend them, to get them on the rail system, to shuttle them out of containment. 
 In wind turbine generators, trunnions are used as two of three or more mounting points for the gearbox (transferring power from the rotor to the generator) which allows for limited movement due to torque variations and an accessible way to remote and service the drive-train .

Trunnion bearings 

In mechanical engineering, it is one part of a rotating joint where a shaft (the trunnion) is inserted into (and turns inside) a full or partial cylinder.  Often used in opposing pairs, this joint allows tight tolerances and strength from a large surface contact area between the trunnion and the cylinder.

In airframe engineering, these are self-contained concentric bearings that are designed to offer fluid movement in a critical area of the steering.

The term is also used to describe the wheel that a rotating cylinder runs on. For example, a lapidary (stone-polishing) cylinder runs on a pair of rollers, similar to trunnions. These rotate at around 30 revolutions per hour. They are supported on a pathring, which runs on trunnions. Similar devices called rotary kilns are used in cement manufacturing.

In mining, some refining plants utilise drum scrubbers in the process that are supported by a large trunnion and associated trunnion bearings at each end.

See also
Gimbal

References

Hardware (mechanical)
Mechanisms (engineering)
Bridge components
Artillery components